This is a list of notable library packages implementing a graphical user interface (GUI) platform-independent GUI library (PIGUI). These can be used to develop software that can be ported to multiple computing platforms with no change to its source code.

In C, C++

In other languages

No longer available or supported

See also 
 List of widget toolkits
 List of rich web application frameworks

Further reading 
 Richard Chimera, Evaluation of Platform Independent User Interface Builders, March 1993, Human-Computer Interaction Laboratory University of Maryland

Computer libraries
Cross-platform software